Greatest Hits is the first compilation album by The Association, released in 1968 by Warner Bros. Records.  The album peaked at #4 on the Billboard 200 album chart.  The RIAA certified the album 2× Platinum on June 1, 1989.

The autobiographical tune "Six Man Band", written by Terry Kirkman, was a new song which had also been released as a mono single in July 1968, then appeared in a stereo mix on this album. The version of "Enter the Young" that is on this collection is a re-recording of a track from their first LP. Despite the title, the album does not include the singles "Pandora's Golden Heebie Jeebies" (which charted at #35 in late 1966) or "Looking Glass" (which was a regional hit), using non-hits such as "Like Always" and "We Love Us" instead.

Some recordings on this album were encoded with the Haeco-CSG process.

Critical reception

Stephen Cook of AllMusic writes, "the majority of this hits collection focuses on the band's dreamy combination of polished folk, limber vocal arrangements, and wide-screen instrumental backdrops" and finishes the review by saying, "A great introduction to the band's prime work from the latter half of the '60s."

David Bowling reviews the album for Seattle P-I and writes, "No matter what success their albums may have achieved, they will always be remembered for their string of singles. Greatest Hits gathers these singles, plus a few other tracks in support, to form a soft rock and pop album that has withstood the test of time surprisingly well."

Track listing

Track information and credits verified from the album's liner notes.

Charts

Certifications

References

The Association albums
1969 greatest hits albums
Warner Records compilation albums
Albums produced by Curt Boettcher
Albums produced by Jerry Yester
Albums produced by Bones Howe